The Cardinals–Cubs rivalry, also called the Route 66 rivalry and The I-55 rivalry, refers to the rivalry between the St. Louis Cardinals and Chicago Cubs of the National League (NL), one of the most bitter rivalries in Major League Baseball and in all of North American professional sports. The Cardinals have won 19 NL pennants, while the Cubs have won 17. However, the Cardinals have a clear edge when it comes to World Series success, having won 11 championships to the Cubs' three. Games between the two clubs see numerous visiting fans in either St. Louis's Busch Stadium or Chicago's Wrigley Field.

The Cubs lead the regular season series 1,259–1,209–19.  The teams' lone MLB playoff meeting occurred in the 2015 National League Division Series, which the Cubs won, 3–1.

First meetings in 19th century World Series
In his book, Before They Were Cardinals, Jon David Cash speculates that the economic trade rivalry between the cities of Chicago and St. Louis led to the formation of the St. Louis Brown Stockings in 1875 to compete with the Chicago White Stockings. The Brown Stockings would later fold and reemerge in 1882 when the Cardinals (as the Browns), met the Cubs (as the White Stockings), in a pair of pre-World Series matchups between American Association champion St. Louis and NL champion Chicago.

First meeting

The first series meeting between the two teams was actually played in four cities — not only St. Louis and Chicago, but also Pittsburgh and Cincinnati. On October 15, Browns manager Charles Comiskey pulled his team off the field in the 6th inning in protest of umpire Dave Sullivan's call. The White Stockings were in the lead at the time 5–4 and were declared a winner on forfeit. Behind pitcher Dave Foutz, St. Louis defeated Chicago 13–4 in Game 7. The Browns claimed the Game 2 forfeit didn't count and therefore claimed the championship. The two clubs split the $1000 prize.

The $15,000 slide

The first series played in 1885 ended in dispute with no winner making the rematch a year later more heated. Game 2 saw the Browns win in a 12-0 romp. Bob Caruthers pitched a one-hitter, and left fielder Tip O'Neill smacked two inside-the-park home runs. It was the first two-home-run game by a player in a World Championship game. Despite the win, the White Stockings had won Games 1 and 3 and took the series lead into St. Louis. Oddities happened in Game 5. With Jim McCormick and Jocko Flynn lame and John Clarkson tired‚ Chicago tried to use a minor league recruit in the pitcher's box‚ only to be refused by the Browns. Shortstop Ned Williamson and right fielder Jimmy Ryan ended up having to pitch. The Browns won easily 10–3. The sixth and final game began at an earlier time of 2:18 PM, so the full nine innings could be played. Pitching his fourth game in six days‚ Clarkson held St. Louis hitless for six innings as Chicago built a 3–0 lead. However, in the 8th, the Browns finally got to Clarkson to tie the game at 3, with Arlie Latham hitting a 2-run triple. In the 10th, Curt Welch scored on the "$15‚000 slide" after a wild pitch to win it in front of a fired-up St. Louis home crowd.

Cardinals join the National League

Early Cubs dominance
After the dissolution of the American Association, the Browns franchise moved to the National League in 1892 and become known as the Cardinals in 1900. (The Browns name was later used by an AL team that had previously been known as the Milwaukee Brewers, and is now the Baltimore Orioles.) St. Louis would not achieve much success in its early years in the NL. On the other hand, the Cubs won three straight pennants from 1906 to 1908 and two World Series during that time. The Cubs would also go on to win seven more pennants from then until 1945.

The tide turns
It would be their first National League pennant and first championship since defeating the White Stockings. Eventually, the Cubs' pennant wins would also stop in 1945, and they did not win another until , when they also won the World Series. The Cardinals have won the World Series 11 times, the most of any National League team and second New York Yankees (27) in all of MLB.

Hack Wilson's riot

Cubs' Slugger Hack Wilson had a combative streak and frequently initiated fights with opposing players and fans. On June 22, 1928, a riot broke out in the ninth inning at Wrigley Field when Wilson jumped into the box seats to attack a heckling fan. An estimated 5,000 spectators swarmed the field before police could separate the combatants and restore order. The fan sued Wilson for $20,000, but a jury ruled in Wilson's favor.

Modern period

The Sandberg Game
One game in particular was cited for putting Cubs second baseman Ryne Sandberg, as well as the 1984 Cubs in general, "on the map", an NBC national telecast of a Cardinals–Cubs game on June 23, . The Cubs had been playing well throughout the season's first few months, but as a team unaccustomed to winning, they had not yet become a serious contender in the eyes of most baseball fans.

Sandberg had played two full seasons in the major leagues, and while he had proven himself to be a top-fielding second baseman and fast on the basepaths (over 30 stolen bases both seasons), his .260-ish batting average and single-digit home run production were respectable for his position but not especially noteworthy, and Sandberg was not talked about outside Chicago. The Game of the Week, however, put the sleeper Cubs on the national stage against their regional rival, the St. Louis Cardinals. Both teams were well-established franchises with a strong fan base outside the Chicago and St. Louis area.

In the ninth inning, the Cubs trailed 9–8, and faced the premier relief pitcher of the time, Bruce Sutter. Sutter was at the forefront of the emergence of the closer in the late 1970s and early 1980s: a hard-throwing pitcher who typically came in just for the ninth inning and saved around 30 games a season. (Sutter was especially dominant in 1984, saving 45 games.) However, in the ninth inning, Sandberg, not yet known for his power, slugged a home run to left field against the Cardinals' ace closer. Despite this dramatic act, the Cardinals scored two runs in the top of the tenth. Sandberg came up again in the tenth inning, facing a determined Sutter with one man on base. As Cubs' radio announcer Harry Caray described it: 

The Cubs went on to win in the 11th inning. The Cardinals' Willie McGee (who had hit for the cycle that day) had already been named NBC's player of the game before Sandberg's first home run. As NBC play-by-play man Bob Costas (who called the game with Tony Kubek) said when Sandberg hit that second home run, "Do you believe it?!" The game is sometimes called "The Sandberg Game". The winning run for the Cubs was driven in by a single off the bat of Dave Owen.

McGwire/Sosa home run chase

In 1998, the teams were connected by the Mark McGwire-Sammy Sosa home run race, credited by many with revitalizing the sport following the players' strike which cancelled the 1994 World Series and the first part of the 1995 season.

In early September the teams met for a two-game series in St. Louis. In the first game, McGwire hit his record-tying 61st home run off pitcher Mike Morgan in the first inning as part of a 3–2 Cardinals victory. The following day, McGwire broke the record with #62 off Steve Trachsel in the fourth inning as part of a 6–3 victory. In a show of sportsmanship, Sammy Sosa embraced and congratulated his rival and on-field opponent after McGwire rounded the bases. McGwire would finish the year with 70 home runs and Sosa with 66. However, the Cubs won the National League wild card, making the playoffs for the first time in nine years, while the Cardinals missed the playoffs. Sosa eventually became the NL MVP that season.

Sosa dedicated each of his 66 home runs that season to the memory of Cubs (and former Cardinals) broadcaster Harry Caray, who died in February that year.

After the chase
A somber showing of acknowledgment between the two teams happened in  when Cubs catcher Joe Girardi addressed the fans at Wrigley Field in a choked up way that the game between the two teams had been cancelled and that the fans should pray for the St. Louis Cardinals family. However, there were fans who booed. Later, a press conference was held where an emotional Girardi addressed the death of Cardinals pitcher Darryl Kile. Girardi, who played for both the Cubs and the Cardinals, addressed the fans in a regional broadcast on Fox.

In 2005, Cubs first baseman Derrek Lee and Cardinals first baseman Albert Pujols were locked in an MVP race. Lee led the NL in hits and batting average and bested Pujols in home runs. For his part, Pujols led the league in runs scored and had the edge on Lee in RBIs. Lee was awarded both the Gold Glove and Silver Slugger as the best NL first baseman on both defense and offense, respectively. However, with the Cardinals winning 100 games and the division and the Cubs finishing 21 games back in fourth place, Pujols won the MVP honors.

On June 4 and 5,  Pujols won back-to-back games against the Cubs with walk-off home runs.

In recent years, tragedies in the Cardinals organization have caused two games between these teams to be postponed. In 2002, after Cardinals pitcher Darryl Kile was found dead in a Chicago hotel room, a game between the teams in Wrigley Field was postponed. Then in 2007, another Cardinals pitcher, Josh Hancock, was killed in a car crash while driving intoxicated, causing a game in St. Louis to be postponed.

Former Cubs shortstop Ryan Theriot, who was acquired by the Cardinals on November 30, 2010, told a St. Louis radio station that he was "finally on the right side of the Cardinals–Cubs rivalry" and that he was happy to be with an organization that emphasized winning World Series championships instead of being "an afterthought". Cubs pitcher Carlos Zambrano called him "the enemy now". The Cardinals won the World Series that season.

The two clubs played each other in the postseason for the first time in the 2015 National League Division Series, as a result of the Cubs' 4–0 victory over the Pittsburgh Pirates in the NL Wild Card Game. The Cubs defeated the Cardinals 3–1 to advance to the National League Championship Series.

The rivalry was further heated after John Lackey and Jason Heyward signed with the Cubs after the 2015 season and Dexter Fowler signed with the Cardinals after the Cubs' 2016 championship season.

Wrigley Field Sweep

In a pivotal series that determined each team's chance for the playoffs, the Cardinals played the Cubs at Wrigley Field in a four-game series from September 19–22, 2019. The Cardinals went into the series three games ahead of the Cubs with the opportunity to clinch the division title, while the Cubs had the opportunity to overtake the Cardinals for the division lead. After the Cardinals won the first two games, the September 21 game was ranked the 5th most exciting game in top 10 MLB games of 2019. In the bottom of the 7th with the Cardinals leading 7–6, Cardinals reliever Giovanny Gallegos committed a no-stop balk while striking out Tony Kemp. The call was seen as controversial to some. Announcer Tim McCarver noted that Gallegos had done that the whole game and that the umpire who called it was the furthest away from the pitcher. Given a second chance, Kemp hit a two-run home run giving the Cubs an 8–7 lead. Cubs closer Craig Kimbrel was called in to close the game for a Cubs win. However, Kimbrel gave up home runs to Yadier Molina and Paul DeJong to give the Cardinals a 9–8 lead. The Cardinals would win by that score.
The Cardinals completed the sweep the next day — their first four-game sweep of the Cubs at Wrigley Field since 1921 — to clinch a playoff spot.

Season-by-season results

|-
| 1892
| style=";" | Colts
| style=";" | 7–5
| Colts, 3–2
| Colts, 4–3
| St. Louis Browns join the National League
|-
| 1893
| style=";" | Browns
| style=";" | 9–3
| Browns, 6–0
| Tie, 3–3
| 
|-
| 1894
| Tie
| 6–6
| Browns, 4–2
| Colts, 4–2
| 
|-
| 1895
| style=";" | Colts
| style=";" | 10–2
| Colts, 5–1
| Colts, 5–1
| 
|-
| 1896
| style=";" | Colts
| style=";" | 9–3
| Tie, 3–3
| Colts, 6–0
|
|-
|-
| 1897
| style=";" | Colts
| style=";" | 8–4
| Colts, 4–2
| Colts, 4–2
| 
|-
| 1898
| style=";" | Orphans
| style=";" | 10–4
| Orphans, 2–0
| Orphans, 8–4
| Colts change their name to "Orphans."
|-
| 1899
| style=";" | Orphans
| style=";" | 8–6
| Perfectos, 5–2
| Orphans, 6–1
| Browns change their name to "Perfectos."
|-

|-
| 1900
| style=";" | Cardinals
| style=";" | 11–9–2
| Cardinals, 6–1–1
| Orphans, 8–5–1
| Perfectos change their name to "Cardinals."
|-
| 1901
| Tie
| 10–10
| Cardinals, 6–4
| Orphans, 6–4
| 
|-
| 1902
| style=";" | Orphans
| style=";" | 12–5–1
| Orphans, 7–1–1
| Orphans, 5–4
| 
|-
| 
| style=";" | Cubs
| style=";" | 16–4
| Cubs, 7–2
| Cubs, 9–2
| Orphans change their name to "Cubs." First year of organized Major League Baseball
|-
| 
| style=";" | Cubs
| style=";" | 15–7
| Cubs, 7–4
| Cubs, 8–3
| 
|-
| 
| style=";" | Cubs
| style=";" | 17–5
| Cubs, 6–3
| Cubs, 11–2
| 
|-
|-
| 
| style=";" | Cubs
| style=";" | 15–6–1
| Cubs, 9–1–1
| Cubs, 6–5
| Cubs lose 1906 World Series. 
|-
| 
| style=";" | Cubs
| style=";" | 16–6–1
| Cubs, 8–5
| Cubs, 8–1–1
| Cubs win ten straight meetings to start the season, Cubs win 1907 World Series.
|-
| 
| style=";" | Cubs
| style=";" | 19–3
| Cubs, 9–2
| Cubs, 10–1
| Cubs win 1908 World Series, their last title until 2016.
|-
| 
| style=";" | Cubs
| style=";" | 15–7–1
| Cubs, 8–3–1
| Cubs, 7–4
|

|-
| 
| style=";" | Cubs
| style=";" | 15–7
| Cubs, 8–3
| Cubs, 7–4
| Cubs lose 1910 World Series
|-
| 
| style=";" | Cubs
| style=";" | 16–6–2
| Cubs, 9–2
| Cubs, 7–4–2
| 
|-
| 
| style=";" | Cubs
| style=";" | 15–7
| Cubs, 7–4
| Cubs, 8–3
| 
|-
| 
| style=";" | Cubs
| style=";" | 16–6–1
| Cubs, 8–3–1
| Cubs, 8–3
| 
|-
| 
| style=";" | Cardinals
| style=";" | 12–10–2
| Cardinals, 6–5–2
| Cardinals, 6–5
| Cubs open Wrigley Field
|-
| 
| style=";" | Cubs
| style=";" | 12–10
| Cardinals, 7–4
| Cubs, 8–3
| 
|-
| 
| style=";" | Cubs
| style=";" | 14–8
| Cubs, 6–4
| Cubs, 8–4
| 
|-
| 
| style=";" | Cardinals
| style=";" | 12–10
| Cubs, 6–5
| Cardinals, 7–4
| 
|-
| 
| style=";" | Cubs
| style=";" | 15–3
| Cubs, 6–3
| Cubs, 9–0
| Cubs lose 1918 World Series
|-
| 
| style=";" | Cubs
| style=";" | 13–7
| Tie, 5–5
| Cubs, 8–2
| 
|-

|-
| 
| style=";" | Cardinals
| style=";" | 12–10
| Cardinals, 8–3
| Cubs, 7–4
| Cardinals move to Sportsman's Park
|-
| 
| style=";" | Cardinals
| style=";" | 14–8
| Cardinals, 6–5
| Cardinals, 8–3
| Cardinals win consecutive season series for the first time in the history of the rivalry.
|-
| 
| style=";" | Cubs
| style=";" | 13–9
| Cubs, 8–3
| Cardinals, 6–5
| Cardinals' 2B Rogers Hornsby wins NL triple crown
|-
| 
| style=";" | Cubs
| style=";" | 12–10
| Cardinals, 7–4
| Cubs, 8–3
| 
|-
| 
| style=";" | Cubs
| style=";" | 15–7
| Cubs, 6–5
| Cubs, 9–2
| 
|-
| 
| style=";" | Cardinals
| style=";" | 14–8
| Cardinals, 7–4
| Cardinals, 7–4
| Hornsby wins second NL triple crown
|-
| 
| Tie
| 11–11
| Cardinals, 6–5
| Cubs, 6–5
| Cardinals win 1926 World Series
|-
| 
| style=";" | Cardinals
| style=";" | 12–9
| Cardinals, 8–2
| Cubs, 7–4
| 
|-
| 
| Tie
| 11–11
| Cubs, 7–4
| Cardinals, 7–4
| Hack Wilson's riot, Cardinals lose 1928 World Series
|-
| 
| style=";" | Cubs
| style=";" | 15–5–1
| Cubs, 6–3–1
| Cubs, 9–2
| Cubs lose 1929 World Series
|-

|-
| 
| Tie
| 11–11
| Cardinals, 6–5
| Cubs, 6–5
| Teams play a 20-inning game on August 28, the longest game in the history of the rivalry.  Cardinals lose 1930 World Series
|-
| 
| style=";" | Cardinals
| style=";" | 14–8
| Cardinals, 8–3 
| Cardinals, 6–5
| Cardinals win 1931 World Series
|-
| 
| style=";" | Cubs
| style=";" | 12–10
| Cardinals, 6–5
| Cubs, 7–4
| Cubs lose 1932 World Series
|-
| 
| Tie
| 11–11
| Cardinals, 7–4
| Cubs, 7–4
| 
|-
| 
| style=";" | Cubs
| style=";" | 12–10
| Cubs, 7–4
| Cardinals, 6–5
| Cardinals win 1934 World Series
|-
| 
| style=";" | Cardinals
| style=";" | 14–8
| Cardinals, 6–5
| Cardinals, 8–3
| Cubs lose 1935 World Series
|-
| 
| style=";" | Cardinals
| style=";" | 13–9
| Cubs, 6–5
| Cardinals, 8–3
| 
|-
| 
| style=";" | Cubs
| style=";" | 17–5
| Cubs, 8–3
| Cubs, 9–2
| 
|-
| 
| style=";" | Cubs
| style=";" | 
| Cubs, 7–4–1
| Cubs, 6–5
| Cubs lose 1938 World Series
|-
| 
| style=";" | Cardinals
| style=";" | 12–10
| Cardinals, 6–5
| Cardinals, 6–5
| 
|-

|-
| 
| style=";" | Cardinals
| style=";" | 14–8
| Cardinals, 8–3
| Cardinals, 6–5
| 
|-
| 
| style=";" | Cardinals
| style=";" | 12–10
| Cardinals, 8–3 
| Cubs, 7–4
|
|-
| 
| style=";" | Cardinals
| style=";" | 16–6
| Cardinals, 9–2
| Cardinals, 7–4
| Cardinals win 1942 World Series
|-
| 
| style=";" | Cardinals
| style=";" | 13–9
| Cardinals, 8–5
| Cardinals, 5–4
| Cardinals lose 1943 World Series
|-
| 
| style=";" | Cardinals
| style=";" | 16–6
| Cardinals, 9–2
| Cardinals, 7–4
| Cardinals win 14 straight meetings to start the season, Cardinals win 1944 World Series
|-
| 
| style=";" | Cardinals
| style=";" | 16–6
| Cardinals, 8–3 
| Cardinals, 8–3 
| Cubs lose 1945 World Series
|-
| 
| style=";" | Cardinals
| style=";" | 14–8
| Cardinals, 6–5
| Cardinals, 8–3 
| Cardinals win 1946 World Series
|-
| 
| style=";" | Cardinals
| style=";" | 12–10
| Cardinals, 6–5
| Cardinals, 6–5
| 
|-
| 
|Tie
|11–11
| Cardinals, 7–4
| Cubs, 7–4
| 
|-
| 
| style=";" | Cardinals
| style=";" | 14–8
| Cardinals, 8–3
| Cardinals, 6–5
| 
|-

|-
| 
| style=";" | Cardinals
| style=";" | 12–10
| Cardinals, 9–2
| Cubs, 8–3
| 
|-
| 
| style=";" | Cardinals
| style=";" | 13–9–1
| Cubs, 6–5–1
| Cardinals, 8–3
| 
|-
| 
| Tie
| 11–11
| Cardinals, 7–4
| Cubs, 7–4
| 
|-
| 
| Tie
| 11–11
| Cardinals, 7–4
| Cubs, 7–4
| 
|-
| 
| style=";" | Cubs
| style=";" | 14–8
| Cubs, 7–4
| Cubs, 7–4
| Cubs win season series for first time since 1938
|-
| 
| style=";" | Cubs
| style=";" | 14–8 
| Cardinals, 6–5
| Cubs, 9–2
| 
|-
| 
| style=";" | Cardinals
| style=";" | 13–9–1
| Cardinals, 8–3
| Cubs, 6–5–1
| 
|-
| 
| style=";" | Cubs
| style=";" | 12–10 
| Cubs, 8–3
| Cardinals, 7–4
| Both teams post 6-game winning streaks over their opponents during this season
|-
| 
| style=";" | Cardinals
| style=";" | 15–7
| Cardinals, 7–4
| Cardinals, 8–3
| 
|-
| 
| style=";" | Cardinals
| style=";" | 12–10
| Cardinals, 6–5
| Cardinals, 6–5
| 
|-

|-
| 
| style=";" | Cardinals
| style=";" | 
| Cardinals, 9–2
| Cubs, 6–5–1
| 
|-
| 
| style=";" | Cardinals
| style=";" | 
|  
| Cubs, 7–4
| 
|-
| 
| style=";" | Cardinals
| style=";" | 11–7
| Cardinals, 5–4
| 
| Cardinals win 17 straight home games from July 1960 to April 1962 (excluding ties).  MLB expansion reduces schedule to 18 meetings per year
|-
| 
| style=";" | Cardinals
| style=";" | 11–7
| Cardinals, 6–3
| Cardinals, 5–4
| 
|-
| 
| style=";" | Cardinals
| style=";" | 12–6
| Cardinals, 6–3
| Cardinals, 6–3
| Cardinals win 1964 World Series
|-
| 
| style=";" | Cubs
| style=";" | 
| Cardinals, 5–4
| Cubs, 6–3–1
| 
|-
| 
| style=";" | Cardinals
| style=";" | 14–4
| Cardinals, 7–2
| Cardinals, 7–2
| Cardinals open Busch Memorial Stadium
|-
| 
| style=";" | Cardinals
| style=";" | 11–6
| Cardinals, 7–2
| Tie, 4–4
| Cardinals win 1967 World Series
|-
| 
| Tie
| 9–9
| Cardinals, 5–4
| Cubs, 5–4
| Cardinals lose 1968 World Series
|-
| 
| Tie
| 9–9
| Cardinals, 5–4
| Cubs, 5–4
| 
|-

|-
| 
| style=";" | Cardinals
| style=";" | 11–7
| Cardinals, 6–3
| Cardinals, 5–4
| 
|-
| 
| Tie
| 9–9
| Cardinals, 5–4 
| Cubs, 5–4
| 
|-
| 
| style=";" | Cubs
| style=";" | 10–8
| Cardinals, 5–4 
| Cubs, 6–3
| 
|-
| 
| Tie
| 9–9
| Cardinals, 5–4 
| Cubs, 5–4
| 
|-
| 
| style=";" | Cardinals
| style=";" | 13–5
| Cardinals, 6–3
| Cardinals, 7–2
| 
|-
| 
| style=";" | Cubs
| style=";" | 11–7 
| Cubs, 5–4
| Cubs, 6–3
| 
|-
| 
| style=";" | Cubs
| style=";" | 12–6 
| Cubs, 5–4 
| Cubs, 7–2 
| 
|-
| 
| style=";" | Cardinals
| style=";" | 11–7 
| Cardinals, 7–2 
| Cubs, 5–4
| 
|-
|  
| style=";" | Cubs
| style=";" | 15–3 
| Cubs, 8–1 
| Cubs, 7–2
| Cubs win first 12 meetings of the season
|-
| 
| style=";" | Cardinals
| style=";" | 10–8
| Cardinals, 6–3 
| Cubs, 5–4
| 
|-

|-
| 
| Tie
| 9–9
| Cubs, 6–3
| 
| 
|-
| 
| style=";" | Cubs
| style=";" |  
| Tie, 3–3 
| Cubs, 2–1–1
| Strike-shortened season
|-
| 
| style=";" | Cardinals
| style=";" |  
| Cardinals, 6–3
| 
| Cardinals win 1982 World Series
|-
| 
| style=";" | Cubs
| style=";" |  
| Cubs, 5–4
| Cubs, 5–4
|
|-
| 
| style=";" | Cubs
| style=";" | 
| Cubs, 6–3
| Cubs, 7–2
| Cubs win the "Sandberg Game" on June 23 on the strength of two Ryne Sandberg home runs in the 9th and 10th innings, both of which tied the game.
|-
| 
| style=";" | Cardinals
| style=";" | 
| Cardinals, 7–2
| 
| Cardinals lose 1985 World Series
|-
| 
| style=";" | Cubs
| style=";" | 
| Cardinals, 5–4 
| Cubs, 6–2 
| 
|-
| 
| style=";" | Cardinals
| style=";" | 
| Cardinals, 6–3
| 
| Cardinals lose 1987 World Series
|-
|  
| style=";" | Cardinals
| style=";" |  
| Cardinals, 5–4
| 
|
|-
| 
| style=";" | Cubs
| style=";" | 
| Cubs, 6–3 
| Cubs, 5–4
| 
|-

|-
| 
| style=";" | Cardinals
| style=";" | 
| Cardinals, 5–4
| 
| 
| 
|-
| 
| style=";" | Cubs
| style=";" | 
| Cardinals, 5–4 
| Cubs, 6–3
| 
| 
|-
| 
| style=";" | Cubs
| style=";" | 
| Cubs, 5–4
| Cubs, 6–3
| 
| 
|-
| 
| style=";" | Cubs
| style=";" | 8–5
| Cubs, 4–2
| Cubs, 4–3
| MLB expansion reduces series to 11–13 meetings per season.
| 
|-
| 
| Tie
| 5–5 
| Cubs, 4–3
| 
| Strike-shortened season.  Strike cancels postseason. MLB adds Wild Card, allowing for both teams to make the postseason in the same year.
| 
|-
| 
| style=";" | Cubs
| style=";" | 9–4
| Cubs, 4–2
| Cubs, 5–2
| 
| 
|-
| 
| style=";" | Cardinals
| style=";" | 8–5
| Cardinals, 5–2 
| Tie, 3–3 
| 
| 
|-
| 
| style=";" | Cardinals
| style=";" | 8–4 
| Cardinals, 4–2 
| 
| 
| 
|-
|  
| style=";" | Cardinals
| style=";" | 7–4 
| Cardinals, 5–0 
| Cubs, 4–2
| McGwire-Sosa home run record chase
|  
|-
| 
| style=";" | Cubs
| style=";" | 7–5 
| Tie, 3–3 
| Cubs, 4–2
| 
| 
|-

|-
| 
| style=";" | Cardinals
| style=";" |  
| Cardinals, 7–0
| Tie, 3–3
| 
| 
|-
| 
| style=";" | Cubs
| style=";" | 9–8 
| Cardinals, 5–2 
| Cubs, 7–3
| MLB changed to an unbalanced schedule in 2001, resulting in 15-19 meetings per year.  Cardinals win 13 straight home meetings from October 1999 to June 2001
| 
|-
| 
| style=";" | Cardinals
| style=";" |  
| Cardinals, 8–1
| Cubs, 5–4
| 
| 
|-
| 
| style=";" | Cardinals
| style=";" | 9–8 
| Cardinals, 5–2
| Cubs, 6–4
| 
| 
|-
| 
| style=";" | Cardinals
| style=";" |  
| Cardinals, 6–4
| 
| Cardinals lose 2004 World Series.
| 
|-
| 
| style=";" | Cubs
| style=";" | 10–6 
| Cubs, 5–3
| Cubs, 5–3
| 
| 
|-
| 
| style=";" | Cubs
| style=";" |  
| Cardinals, 6–3
| Cubs, 8–2 
| Cardinals open Busch Stadium, win 2006 World Series
| 
|-
| 
| style=";" | Cubs
| style=";" | 
| Cubs, 7–2 
| Cubs, 4–3
| 
| 
|-
|  
| style=";" | Cubs
| style=";" | 9–6
| Cubs, 5–4 
| Cubs, 4–2 
| 
| 
|-
| 
| style=";" | Cardinals
| style=";" |  
| Cardinals, 7–2 
| Cubs, 4–3 
| 
| 
|-

|-
| 
| style=";" | Cubs
| style=";" | 9–6
| Cubs, 5–1
| Cardinals, 5–4
| 
| 
|-
| 
| style=";" | Cardinals
| style=";" |  
| Cardinals, 7–2
| Tie, 3–3
| Cardinals win 2011 World Series
| 
|-
| 
| style=";" | Cardinals
| style=";" |  
| Cardinals, 6–2
| Cubs, 5–4
| 
| 
|-
| 
| style=";" | Cardinals
| style=";" | 
| Cardinals, 7–3
| Cardinals, 5–4
| MLB realignment results in 19 meetings per season starting in 2013.  Cardinals lose 2013 World Series.
| 
|-
| 
| style=";" | Cardinals
| style=";" | 
| Cardinals, 6–4
| Cubs, 5–4
| 
| 
|-
| 
| style=";" | Cardinals
| style=";" | 
| Cardinals, 7–3
| Cubs, 5–4
| Cardinals win 100 games, Cubs win 97 games, Two of the three best records in MLB that season (along with NL Central rival Pittsburgh).
| 
|- style="background:#f2f2f2; font-weight:bold;"
|  2015 NLDS
| style=";" | Cubs
| style=";" | 3–1
|  Tie, 1–1
|  Cubs, 2–0
|  Only postseason meeting between the two teams since Cardinals joined the National League in 1892.
|-
| 
| style=";" | Cubs
| style=";" |  
| Cubs, 6–3 
| Cardinals, 6–4 
| Cubs win 2016 World Series, their first title since 1908.
| 
|-
| 
| style=";" | Cubs
| style=";" |  
| Cubs, 6–4 
| Cubs, 8–1
| 
| 
|-
|  
| style=";" | Cardinals
| style=";" | 
| Cardinals, 6–3
| Cubs, 6–4
| 
| 
|-
|  
| style=";" | Cardinals
| style=";" |  
| Cardinals, 6–3
| Cubs, 6–4
| 
| 
|-

|-
| 
| Tie
| 5–5
| Cubs, 2–1
| 
| Season shortened to 60 games (with 10 meetings) due to COVID-19 pandemic. All Cardinals' home games were played at Wrigley Field (though the Cardinals batted second) after their lone home series was postponed as a result of an outbreak among the Cardinals.
| 
|-
| 
| style=";" | Cardinals
| style=";" |  
| Tie, 5–5
| Cardinals, 5–4
| 
| 
|-
| 
| style=";" | Cardinals
| style=";" |  
| Cardinals, 7–2
| Cardinals, 6–4
| Last year of 19 division games.
| 
|-
| 
| 
| 
| 
| 
| Includes a two-game series in London, counted as home games for St. Louis
| 
|-

|-
| Regular Season 
| style=";" | Cubs  
| style=";" | 1259–1209–19
|  Cardinals, 666–559–11
|  Cubs, 700–543–8
| 
|-
| Postseason games 
| style=";" | Cubs  
| style=";" | 3–1 
|  Tie, 1–1
|  Cubs, 2–0
| 
|-
| Postseason Series
| style=";" | Cubs  
| style=";" | 1–0
| 
| 
| 
|-
| Regular and postseason 
| style=";" | Cubs  
| style=";" | 1262–1210–19
|  Cardinals, 667–560–11
|  Cubs, 702–543–8
| 
|-

Territorial rights

In his book Three Nights in August, Buzz Bissinger compared the Cardinals–Cubs rivalry to another famous rivalry in MLB: "The Red Sox and Yankees is a tabloid-filled soap opera about money and ego and sound bites. But the Cubs and Cardinals are about... geography and territorial rights."

One of the "territories" in question is central Illinois, which receives both radio broadcasts of Cardinals games on KMOX, while WGN radio & WGN television, (including WGN-TV's superstation) formerly broadcast Cubs games, with the Cubs' radio rights moving to WBBM in 2015, then WSCR in 2016. All four radio stations are traditional "clear channel" AM radio stations, and both teams fought for fans in the Western states prior to Major League expansion. 

Prior to Major League expansion, the Cardinals traditionally claimed huge parts of the Lower Midwest and the South in their territory, while the Cubs claimed the Upper Midwest, even after the Braves, then the Brewers, were placed in Milwaukee, and the Twins in Minnesota, as those teams then played in the American League.

Loyalties to the two teams divided friends, families, and co-workers, and shaped the locals in various ways, as George Will noted in a 1998 commencement address at Washington University in St. Louis: "I grew up in Champaign, Illinois, midway between Chicago and St. Louis. At an age too tender for life-shaping decisions, I made one. While all my friends were becoming Cardinals fans, I became a Cub fan. My friends, happily rooting for Stan Musial, Red Schoendienst, and other great Redbirds, grew up cheerfully convinced that the world is a benign place, so of course, they became liberals. Rooting for the Cubs in the late 1940s and early 1950s, I became gloomy, pessimistic, morose, dyspeptic and conservative. It helped out of course that the Cubs last won the World Series in 1908, which is two years before Mark Twain and Tolstoy died. But that means, class of 1998, that the Cubs are in the 89th year of their rebuilding effort, and remember, any team can have a bad moment."

The rivalry between the two teams is an important regionalism in the Netflix show Ozark. In order to establish Jason Bateman's character, Marty Byrde, as a Chicago native who moved to Lake Ozark, Missouri, the show writers included several references to the rivalry through the first season. This often manifests as negative comments from Byrde to a southern Missouri Cardinals fan. One says to him "I was raised to hate the Cubs," to which he fires back "And I was raised to hate the Cardinals."

Notable personalities

Many players have played for both teams, including Hall of Famer Rogers Hornsby, who holds several single season hitting records for both clubs. Notably, Hall of Famer Lou Brock was traded from the Cubs to the Cardinals early in his career for pitcher Ernie Broglio. This is widely considered one of the most one-sided trades in baseball history. Other Hall of Famers who played/managed with both clubs include Grover Cleveland Alexander, Clark Griffith, Burleigh Grimes, Bruce Sutter, Roger Bresnahan, Dizzy Dean, Dennis Eckersley, Rabbit Maranville, Hoyt Wilhelm, and Leo Durocher.

Legendary announcer Harry Caray began his career in St. Louis, broadcasting on KMOX radio for 24 seasons, before moving to Chicago in 1971, announcing 11 seasons for the White Sox before moving to the North Side and becoming a staple of WGN radio and television broadcasts for the Cubs from 1982 until his death before the 1998 season.

The rivalry between the two clubs intensified following the hiring of Dusty Baker to manage the Cubs following in 2003. In 2002, when Baker was managing the San Francisco Giants, he and Cardinals manager Tony La Russa had run-ins during that year's National League Championship Series, with the animosity carrying over to Baker's tenure with the Cubs. According to Baker, part of the intensity stems from the close relationship of the two. "It's very intense...When you play 18 times against a team that's had a long-time rivalry, and my former manager and my former confidant, that just increases things." Baker played for La Russa in 1986 as a member of the Oakland Athletics.

Some say that the feud between the two managers added to the rivalry between the two teams. "Both managers are fiercely protective of their players. Both believe in old-school baseball protocol. Neither will sit by idly and watch an opponent show up their team. Both are fierce competitors with enormous pride…. Fans don’t usually buy tickets to watch managers manage . . . but this tactical showdown added something to the Cubs-Cards series."

After the Cubs fired Baker in 2006, they replaced him with Lou Piniella. Coincidentally, Piniella and La Russa both grew up in Tampa and faced each other in the 1990 World Series as managers of the Cincinnati Reds and Oakland Athletics, respectively.

Statistical comparison
As of the beginning of the 2021 MLB Season

Championships and Playoff Appearances

Award Winners
As of the beginning of the 2021 MLB Season

Single season records

Hall of Fame plaques with team logo
Cardinals – (12)
Lou Brock (1985)
Rogers Hornsby (1947)
Dizzy Dean (1953)
Bob Gibson (1981)
Whitey Herzog (2010)
Stan Musial (1969)
Red Schoendienst (1989)
Ted Simmons (2020)
Enos Slaughter (1985)
Ozzie Smith (2002)
Bruce Sutter (2006)
Billy Southworth (2008)

Cubs – (12)
Ernie Banks (1977)
Frank Chance (1946)
Kiki Cuyler (1968)
Johnny Evers (1946)
Gabby Hartnett (1955)
Billy Herman (1975)
Ferguson Jenkins (1991)
Ryne Sandberg (2005)
Ron Santo (2012)
Lee Smith (2019)
Billy Williams (1987)
Hack Wilson (1979)

See also
Major League Baseball rivalries
Blackhawks–Blues rivalry – equivalent in the National Hockey League
Bears–Cardinals rivalry
1998 Major League Baseball home run record chase

References
Inline citations

Bibliography

Major League Baseball rivalries
Chicago Cubs
St. Louis Cardinals
Sports in the Midwestern United States